Tan Jianci (born October 5, 1990), also known by his stage name JC-T, is a Chinese actor, singer, and dancer. He is the youngest member of the Chinese idol group M.I.C. Tan is now active as an actor in China and is known for his roles as Sima Zhao in The Advisors Alliance (2017) and Cao Pi in Secret of the Three Kingdoms (2018), Chen Renxiang in Winter Begonia (2020), Shen Yi in Under the skin (2022) and Gu Yun in upcoming Winner is King.

Early life 
Tan Jianci was born and raised in Beihai, Guangxi. He studied at the Beihai Haicheng No.3 Elementary School. At the age of 6, he moved to Kumamoto, Japan with his family for a year during which time he changed his own name to Kenji (健次) due to his adoration for Kenshiro, a fictional character and the protagonist of the Fist of the North Star manga series. He returned to China at the age of 7 and attended Beihai No. 3 Primary School of Guangxi. Inspired by Michael Jackson, he began to take dance classes in his spare time. At the age of 13, he attended the affiliated secondary school of Beijing Dance Academy where he learned professional ballroom dance. In 2006, he participated in three tournaments, Taoli Cup National Dance Competition – Latin (where he finished in first place in the group under 16), the National Dance Sport Championships Professional – Latin (1st place) and Modern (5th place) and the World Grand Prix Finals in Shanghai – IDSF – Latin (3rd place) and Modern (4th place). In 2007, he was admitted to the Beijing Sport University's Art department.

Career 
In 2006, Tan was selected as one of the trainees of Taihe Rye Music's project group and started the 3-year training period since 2007. 
In 2009, as a member of the boy group M.I.C., he and the other members debuted at Chengdu WCG (World Cyber Games).
In 2009, the group participated in MIGU Star Academy and eventually won the finals. They officially debuted in October 2010.

In 2008, Tan made his acting debut in the film Lost Indulgence directed by Zhang Yibai. He played a bereaved and sullen teenager.

In March 2012, Tan participated in the dance competition show Shake It Up, and got fourth place in the final round.

In December 2014, Tan's first solo single titled "Fly Away" was released.

In January 2015, Tan starred in his first drama Hua Yang Jiang Hu. In May 2015, Tan starred in the his first musical Tiny Times, adapted from the film of the same name.

In 2017, Tan co-starred in historical drama The Advisors Alliance. He was cast as Sima Zhao, the second son of the protagonist Sima Yi. Tan received recognition for his acting skills.

In 2018, Tan starred in Secret of the Three Kingdoms . He played Cao Pi, the second son of Cao Cao and the first emperor of Wei Dynasty. The same year, Tan participated in the acting competition show I Am the Actor, earning approval from the audience and achieving an A Grade on the show. He then starred in the romance drama Never Gone, portraying a frivolous playboy who shows a serious side.

In 2019, Tan starred in the family drama Over the Sea I Come to You, romance comedy film Adoring.

In 2020, Tan starred in republican drama Winter Begonia and received praise for his performance as an opera singer. The same year he was cast in the wuxia drama Winner Is King, adapted from the BL novel Sha Po Lang by Priest alongside Chen Zheyuan. He plays Gu Yun, a military commander.

In 2022, Tan Starred in IQIYI drama Under the Skin and received praise for his portrayal of a genius painter who joined the police force to repay for his involvement in the death of a police officer and to find out the truth of what happened all those years ago.

In 2022, on September 16, Tan and Zhou Ye starred in the urban romance drama "Missing You".

Filmography

Film

Television series

Television show

Music video

Discography

Awards and nominations

References

External links
 

1990 births
Living people
Chinese male film actors
21st-century Chinese male singers
Male actors from Guangxi
People from Beihai
Chinese male television actors
Beijing Sport University alumni
Chinese male dancers
Chinese idols
21st-century dancers
Chinese expatriates in Japan
21st-century Chinese male actors